Manifest and latent functions are social scientific concepts created by anthropologist, Bronislaw Malinowski in 1922 while studying the Trobriand Islanders in the Western Pacific. It was later modified for sociology by Robert K. Merton. Merton appeared interested in sharpening the conceptual tools to be employed in a functional analysis.  

Each system in society has a specific function that relies on and is associated to other systems. When these systems function, it leads to social stability. Dysfunction in one or more systems leads to social instability. Both functions and dysfunctions can be latent or manifest. Manifest functions or dysfunctions are deliberate and known. While latent functions or dysfunctions are unintended and/or go unrecognized by many. Positive or negative values are not attached to functions or dysfunctions. In other words, things that are often viewed by people as wrong or harmful can lead to social stability as much as things that are commonly viewed as right or fair.

Functions
Manifest functions are the consequences that people see, observe or even expect. It is explicitly stated and understood by the participants in the relevant action. The manifest function of a rain dance, used as an example by Merton in his 1957  Social Theory and Social Structure, is to produce rain, and this outcome is intended and desired by people participating in the ritual.

Latent functions are those that are neither recognized nor intended. A latent function of a behavior is not explicitly stated, recognized, or intended by the people involved. Thus, they are identified by observers. In the example of rain ceremony, the latent function reinforces the group identity by providing a regular opportunity for the members of a group to meet and engage in a common activity.

Peter L. Berger describes a series of examples illustrating the differences between manifest functions and latent dysfunctions:

While Talcott Parsons tends to emphasize the manifest functions of social behavior, Merton sees attention to latent functions as increasing the understanding of society: the distinction between manifest and latent forces the sociologist to go beyond the reasons individuals give for their actions or for the existence of customs and institutions; it makes them look for other social consequences that allow these practices’ survival and illuminate the way society works.

Dysfunctions 
Dysfunctions can also be manifest or latent. While functions are intended or recognized (manifest), and may have a positive effect on society, dysfunctions are unintended or unrecognized, and have a negative effect on society.

Manifest dysfunctions are anticipated disruptions of social life. For example, a manifest dysfunction of a festival might include disruptions of transportation and excessive production of garbage. Latent dysfunctions are unintended and unanticipated disruptions of order and stability. In the festival example, they would be represented by people missing work due to the traffic jam.

Medical science model 

Broadly stated and here relying on the systems model first developed in medical science, an interrelated bundle of social structures (e.g., Zulu culture), treated as a social system, involves the parts (structural elements) acting in such a fashion so as to help maintain the homeodynamic equilibrium of the system of which they are an element. Manifest functions are the obvious and intended consequences a structural feature displays in the maintenance of the steady state of the system of which it is a part. Latent functions are less obvious or unintended consequences. Both manifest and latent functions contribute to the social system’s unchanging ongoingness or stasis. In this very specific sense both may be interpreted as useful and positive.

In conducting a functional analysis, dysfunctions are consequences of structural elements that produce changes in their environing social system. The flame of the candle system flickers. The structural cause would be labeled dysfunctional. The candle’s steady state has been disturbed or changed. The concept affords the only relief to structural-functionalism’s inherent conservative bias. Dysfunction signifies the mechanism by which social change is evidenced within a social system.  Whether that change is manifest or latent is a relatively simple empirical question. Whether that change is good or bad would seem to require interpretative criteria not afforded by a social scientific paradigm for functional analysis.

Quotes 
 "... the distinction between manifest and latent functions was devised to preclude ... confusion ... between conscious motivations for social behaviour and its objective consequences" - Robert K. Merton, Social Theory and Social Structure, 1957, page 61 
 "... I have adapted the terms "manifest" and "latent" from their use in another context by Freud...", .
 "Emile Durkheim's... analysis of the social functions of punishment is... focused on its latent functions (consequences for the community) rather than confined to manifest functions (consequences for the criminal)", ibid.

See also 
 Structural functionalism
 Unintended consequences

References

External links 
 MANIFEST AND LATENT FUNCTIONS Extract from  Robert K. Merton, Social Theory and Social Structure. Glencoe, IL: Free Press, 1957, pp. 60 – 69.
 MANIFEST/LATENT FUNCTION, definition at Principia Cybernetica Web

Further reading 
 ANTHROPOLOGICAL THEORIES: A GUIDE PREPARED BY STUDENTS FOR STUDENTS Dr. M.D. Murphy
 THE UNANTICIPATED CONSEQUENCES OF HUMAN ACTION: A Synoposis of the Structure-Functional Theories of Robert K. Merton, Diligio, 2000
  Merton, Robert K.  1957.  Social Theory and Social Structure, revised and enlarged edition.  New York:  Free Press of Glencoe. Excerpts, selected by Frank Elwell
 Manifest and Latent Functions Excerpt from Invitation to Sociology by Peter L. Berger, pp. 40–41 (NY: Doubleday (Anchor Books), 1963)
 David B. Brinkerhoff, Suzanne T. Ortega, Rose Weitz, Thomson Wadsworth, 2004,  Google Print, p. 12]
 Joan Ferrante, Sociology: A Global Perspective, Thomson Wadsworth, 2005, Google Print, p.37
 Paul Helm, Manifest and Latent Functions, The Philosophical Quarterly, Vol. 21, No. 82 (Jan., 1971), pp. 51–60, JSTOR

Dichotomies
Sociological terminology
Sociological theories
Robert K. Merton